Raphael Beck may refer to:

 Raphael Beck (artist) (1858–1947), American artist
 Raphael Beck (badminton) (born 1992), German badminton player